Dušan Pavlović (born in April 1969), is Serbian political economist, political analyst, author, and former politician.

Early life and education
Pavlović was born in 1969 in Zagreb, Croatia. He moved with his mother to Belgrade in 1981. Between 1989 and 1994, while a student in Belgrade, Pavlović was a founder member of doo-wop band Vampiri. He played a rhythm guitar.

He received his BA degree from the Faculty of Political Sciences at the University of Belgrade in 1994, and MA and PhD degrees from the Central European University in Budapest in 1997 and 2003, respectively. Since 2005, he teaches political economy with public choice at the Faculty of Political Science in Belgrade, where he currently holds the title of an associate professor. His areas of interest are political economy of democratic institutions, and rational and public choice theory.

Research Interest
Between 1996 and 2005, he worked at the Institute for European Studies (1996-2001), the G17 institute (2001-2003), and the Jefferson Institute in Belgrade (2004-2005).

His academic works include Consolidation of Democratic Institutions in Serbia after 2000 (2007), Writings in Political Economy (2010), and Game Theory: Basic Games and Applications (2014). He authored a number of articles in Politika, Danas, Vreme and other newspapers in 2001-2013. He regularly blogs on public policy and theoretical issues on his blog named Political blogonomy.

Politics
Between September 2013 and January 2014, Pavlović was an advisor to the Minister of Economy, position held by his close friend Saša Radulović, in the government dominated by Aleksandar Vučić's Serbian Progressive Party When Radulović resigned after falling out with Vučić, Pavlović did the same. Together, they formed the neo-liberal Enough is Enough movement, advocating the changes in Serbian political culture and the breakup of political cartels in Serbia, which has eventually raised to the level of a political party. On the 2016 Serbian parliamentary election, the movement won 6.02% of the vote and 16 seats in the National Assembly. Pavlović, who was second on the list, became an MP on June 2, 2016.

Pavlović left Enough is Enough on 1 November 2018, and submitted the resignation to the Serbian Assembly on 13 November 2018.

Money Wasting Machine
In April 2016, he published a book titled Mašina za rasipanje para. Pet meseci u ministarstvu privrede for publisher Dan Graf, which is half-theoretical, half-biographical account of the five months he spent as an advisor to the minister of economy, Saša Radulović. The book sold 1,000 copies within less than two months. Dan Graf added another 1,000 copies in mid-June 2016. The 3d updated edition in another 600 copies came out in October 2018 with the new chapter on neoliberalism in Serbia. The CEU Press printed the English version of this book in Summer 2022.

References

External links
 Faculty of political science webpage: https://www.fpn.bg.ac.rs/faculty/dusan-pavlovic
 Researchgate: https://www.researchgate.net/profile/Dusan-Pavlovic-5
 Google Schoalr: https://scholar.google.com/citations?user=DfZatiEAAAAJ&hl=en

1969 births
Politicians from Belgrade
Serbian economists
University of Belgrade Faculty of Political Science alumni
Academic staff of the University of Belgrade
Living people